The Clones of Bruce Lee (Cantonese: 神威三猛龍; Korean: 蛇形三傑 Death Penalty on Three Robots; Taiwanese: 複製人李小龍：三龍怒火) is a 1980 Bruceploitation martial arts film capitalizing on the death of actor and martial arts star Bruce Lee in 1973.

The film gathers together several of the many Lee imitators who sprang up after the icon's death (including Dragon Lee, Bruce Le and Bruce Lai), alongside performers from the real Lee's films and other veterans of the Hong Kong movie industry.  It has been called "The Mount Rushmore of Bruceploitation films".

Synopsis
Immediately after the death of Bruce Lee in Hong Kong, Colonel Colin (Andy Hannah) of the Special Branch of Investigations asks Professor Lucas (Jon T. Benn), a brilliant scientist, to take samples of the late master's brain tissue. Using these samples, Lucas creates three perfect clones of Lee: Bruce Lee 1 (Dragon Lee), Bruce Lee 2 (Bruce Le), and Bruce Lee 3 (Bruce Lai).  They are trained in martial arts by Bolo Yeung and Chiang Tao. The mission of the clones is to fight crime in Southeast Asia.

Bruce Lee 1 goes undercover as an actor for a corrupt, gold-smuggling producer who plans to have him die on camera.  Meanwhile, the other clones go to Thailand where they meet up with Chuck (Bruce Thai), a local SBI agent who is not a clone but who also resembles Bruce Lee. They have been assigned to kill Dr. Ngai, a mad scientist who is plotting to take over the world with his army of bronze automatons: men whose skin turns to metal when they are injected with Ngai's special formula.

The clones successfully complete their missions and return to Hong Kong. But Professor Lucas, disgruntled because he feels he was not properly rewarded by the SBI for creating the clones, pits them against one another. The professor's female assistants stop the three clones from fighting amongst themselves, and Lucas sends out a small army of men to dispatch the clones. By the end of the film, Bruce Lee 3 has been killed—but so have all of Professor Lucas's henchmen (including the two kung-fu instructors, both defeated by Bruce Lee 1). Bruce Lee 2 finishes off Lucas's personal bodyguard and the professor is arrested.

Reaction
On the website Kung Fu Cinema, Mark Pollard sums up much of the appeal of the film, writing:"Clones of Bruce Lee is the Plan 9 from Outer Space of Hong Kong cinema. It's the very definition of bad filmmaking and sleazy exploitation. Expect to witness mad scientists bent on world domination, death rays, bronzemen, and naked women frolicking on the beach. Despite some decent kung fu action, particularly with Bolo, it's so bad you'll laugh or turn it off."

A review on the website The Bad Movie Report finds it less enjoyable:"Although the Lee-alikes are in superb shape, and certainly know their Lee chops, there is a deadening sameness about the fight scenes that eventually robs the movie of all joy; this flick is, after all, 95% fight scenes. I've always preferred the swordplay-oriented kung fu movies- the more weapons, and the more bizarre, the better. Let's face it, the numerous styles notwithstanding (and there are several on display), there are only so many ways to aim a blow at your opponent and only so many ways to block that blow. Without a good fight coordinator, like Lee himself, Jimmy Wang Yu, Samo Hung or a host of others, after forty-five minutes of the same fight over and over, each subsequent fight becomes the kinetic equivalent of white noise: your mind more or less goes on vacation."

Production notes
The Clones of Bruce Lee contains the only fight scene between Bruce Le and Dragon Lee.

Jon T. Benn, who plays Professor Lucas and is familiar to Bruce Lee fans as the mob boss from Way of the Dragon, later appeared as an American businessman in Jet Li's film Fearless.

This film is one of several appearances in the Bruceploitation subgenre for Bolo Yeung, who won fame for his portrayal of the muscular villain Bolo in Bruce Lee's Enter The Dragon.

References

External links
 IMDb entry
 HK cinemagic entry
 Clones of Bruce Lee – The Ultimate Guide To Bruce Lee Exploitation Cinema
 The Clones of Bruce Lee at Korean Movie Database
 The Clones of Bruce Lee at Korean Powerhouse

1980 films
1980 martial arts films
Hong Kong martial arts films
1980s Cantonese-language films
Bruceploitation films
Films about cloning
Kung fu films
Mad scientist films
1980s Hong Kong films